The Pirate Party Switzerland is a political party in Switzerland, based on the model of the Swedish Pirate Party. The party was founded on 12 July 2009, in Zürich, by about 150 people. By the end of February 2012, the PPS had around about 1,800 members.

The first election success happened on 7 March 2010, when Marc Wäckerlin was elected to the Winterthur city council.

Patrick Mächler of the PPS was head member of Pirate Parties International (PPI) from July 2009 to February 2010, the umbrella organisation of the international Pirate Party movement.

On 13 March 2011, the party achieved 0.8% of the votes in a local election in Lausanne. On 3 April, they obtained 0.56% of the vote in a regional election in Zurich.
In the federal elections of October 2011, the party failed to win a seat, gathering 0.48% of the popular vote (11,616 votes).  On 23 September 2012, PPS member Alex Arnold was elected as part-time mayor of Eichberg.

Change in number of members

Party was founded. (12 July 2009, 150 people at the foundation)
Federal elections in Germany, speaking press published several articles on the German Pirate Party. (3 October 2009, 500 members)
Prevention campaign on violent video games, flash mob in Bern. (18 March 2010, 750 members)
Wikileaks case, the site under the domain name wikileaks.ch belongs to Swiss Pirate Party. (3 December 2010, 950 members)
Elections in Berlin where the Pirate Party gets 9% of the vote. (16 September 2011, 1,425 members)
Achieved 2000 members. (12 July 2012)

References

External links 

 Pirate Party Switzerland

 
Switzerland
2009 establishments in Switzerland
Political parties established in 2009